Xiomara Fortuna (born 1959, Monte Cristi, Dominican Republic) is a Dominican singer and composer. She is known for her deep voice and her work in the genres of world music, música raíz (a Dominican style combining rock, jazz and afro-Dominican rhythms), jazz and contemporary music.

Biography 
Xiomara Fortuna was born in the province of Monte Cristi, in the northwest region of the Dominican Republic, at the border with Haiti

Her mother introduced her to music. Her first exposure to music was Dominican folk music, including vocal and dance. As a youth, she was interested in Trova and social justice-themed music. She wrote her first songs as a teenager.

After high school, she enrolled in the Universidad Autónoma de Santo Domingo (UASD). She began performing live in Santo Domingo. She performed in Kaliumbe, where she honed her musical style inspired by traditional Caribbean music, specifically the music of the Dominican Republic and Haiti. She lives in Santo Domingo and at Rancho Ecológico El Campeche she founded In 2010, a group from Gettysburg College visited her ranch.

She has performed in Switzerland, Cuba, Russian and France. She has collaborated with Archie Shepp and performed with Miriam Makeba and Toure Kunda.

Discography 
 De la Loma al Llano (1985)
 Balbuceos (1996)
 Pan Music and Música Raíces (1997)
 Kumbajei (2001)
 Ella ta' í (2002)
 Tonada para un Querer (2004)
 La Calle Será La Calle(2009)
 Paseando (2010)
 Pa Cantarte a tí (2010)

References

Sources 
  Article on Xiomara Fortuna (in English)

External links
Xiomara Fortuna, Sunshine records

20th-century Dominican Republic women singers
21st-century Dominican Republic women singers
1959 births
Living people